Springvale is the name of some places in the U.S. state of Wisconsin:

Springvale, Columbia County, Wisconsin, a town
Springvale, Fond du Lac County, Wisconsin, a town